Ivan Simeonov Duichev (May 1, 1907, Sofia - April 24, 1986, Sofia) was a Bulgarian historian and paleographer with a focus on Bulgarian and Byzantine medieval history. Throughout his scientific and research life he has followed the maxim of his teacher Vasil Zlatarski that Bulgarian history is inextricably linked and incomprehensible without Byzantine history. Adopted as the father of Bulgarian archival studies.

He specialized and defended his doctorate at the University of Rome on the topic "Asen dynasty in Byzantium". He is a graduate of the Vatican School of Paleography, Diplomatics and Archives Administration. The patron saint of Cardinal Angelo Mercati, the Vatican Apostolic Archive Archbishop, is the patron and mentor.

After the Balkan campaign, he worked on the ground in Macedonia. Translator of the Italian Headquarters and Commandant's Office in Greece during the Second World War. In 1945, for the purpose of educating and publicizing the war in support of the Macedonian Bulgarians, the new Greek authorities included Ivan Duychev in a list of Bulgarian, Italian, and German military and other individuals to be tried in Athens as war criminals. Duichev is accused in particular of "the theft and removal of Greek cultural values from Greece to Bulgaria", such as the Greek authorities' interpretation of the Bulgarian cultural heritage on the territory of Greece, and in particular in Aegean Macedonia, which Duichev saved from plunder. a side of anti-Bulgarian Greek partisans.

Member of the Accademia di Belle Arti di Palermo, Corresponding Member of the British Academy (London), Member of the Pontifical Academy of Archeology (Rome), winner of the Herder Prize (1974). His scientific output includes over 500 publications.

Its name is given by the Institute for Slavic-Byzantine Studies at Sofia University. His is the prototype of the professor-medievalist in the novel by Elisabeth Kostova "The Historian" (2005).

Ivan Duichev contributed to the definitive methodological continuity perception of the medieval history of Bulgaria with respect to Byzantine Bulgaria and Ottoman Bulgaria.

See also
 Golden Age of medieval Bulgarian culture 
 Bulgarian historiography
 Cyrillo-Methodian Studies 
 Macedonia naming dispute

References

20th-century Bulgarian historians
Bulgarian medievalists
Palaeographers
Archivists
1907 births
1986 deaths
Sofia University alumni
Academic staff of Sofia University
Sapienza University of Rome alumni
Members of the Bulgarian Academy of Sciences
Corresponding Fellows of the British Academy
Foreign members of the Serbian Academy of Sciences and Arts
Cyrillo-Methodian studies
Scholars of Byzantine history